Out of the Gutter is an album by the band Cockney Rejects released in 2002.

Track listing 

"Out of the Gutter"
"Nobody Knows"
"Beginning of the End"
"It Still Means Something"
"Rock 'N' Roll Dream"
"You Gotta Have It"
"Take It On The Chin"
"Calling The Shots"
"Collar Felt Blues"
"Shit Or Bust"
"Go Down Fighting"
"Grin and Bear It"
"Snide"

References

2002 albums
Cockney Rejects albums